Denys Volodymyrovych Favorov (born 1 April 1991) is a Ukrainian professional footballer who plays as a defender for Polish III liga club Wieczysta Kraków.

Career

Cherkaskyi Dnipro
In 2014 he played for Cherkaskyi Dnipro.

Desna Chernihiv
 In March 2016 he signed with Desna Chernihiv in the Ukrainian First League, signing a contract for 1.5 years. In Chernigov, he soon became one of the leaders of the team. In week 3 of the 2016–17 Ukrainian First League season, he was voted Player of the Week.

On 13 July 2017 Favorov signed a new contract with Desna for a period of 3 years. With Desna, he was promoted to the Ukrainian Premier League in the 2017–18 season.

In the 2018–19 season, Favorov finished with 15 goals in all competitions, making him the team's top scorer and earning him Player of the Year honours.

During the 2019–20 Ukrainian First League play-offs, he scored a penalty in a 2–0 away win against Kolos Kovalivka. On 5 July 2020, he scored two goals against FC Kolos Kovalivka on his way to Play of the Week plaudits.

These efforts earned Desna a place in the 2020–21 UEFA Europa League third qualifying round for the first time in club history.

Favarov was included in the Best IX squad for the 2019–20 Ukrainian Premier League.

Zorya Luhansk
On 9 August 2020, Favorov signed a 2-year contract with Zorya Luhansk in the Ukrainian Premier League. On 22 August he scored his first goal for the new club against Desna Chernihiv at the Stadion Yuri Gagarin in Chernihiv in the first match of the 2019–20 Ukrainian Premier League.

On 22 October he made his debut in the 2020–21 UEFA Europa League against Leicester City at the King Power Stadium. On 3 December he provided the assist for Allahyar Sayyadmanesh's for the winning goal against Leicester in the return fixture at Slavutych-Arena. On 17 April 2021, he scored against Vorskla Poltava in the 2019–20 Ukrainian Premier League.

Wieczysta Kraków
On 2 August 2022, he signed a two-year contract with Polish III liga side Wieczysta Kraków. On 6 August, he played his first match with the new club against Ostrowiec. On 24 September he scored his first goal with the new club against Unia Tarnów.

Personal life
His younger brother Artem Favorov is also a professional footballer.

Career statistics

Club

Honours

Club
Desna Chernihiv
 Ukrainian First League: 2017–18

Zorya Luhansk
Ukrainian Cup runner-up: 2020–21

Individual
 Ukrainian Footballer of the Year: 2020
 Desna Chernihiv Player of the Year: 2018–19
 Ukrainian First League Best player: 2017–18

References

External links
 Profile on Official website of FC Desna Chernihiv
 
 

1991 births
Living people
Footballers from Kyiv
Ukrainian footballers
Association football midfielders
FC Arsenal Kyiv players
FC Poltava players
FC Cherkashchyna players
FC Desna Chernihiv players
FC Desna Chernihiv captains
FC Zorya Luhansk players
Wieczysta Kraków players
Ukrainian Premier League players
Ukrainian First League players
Ukrainian Second League players
Ukrainian expatriate footballers
Expatriate footballers in Poland
Ukrainian expatriate sportspeople in Poland